Albert Ernest Forsythe (25 February 1897 – 6 May 1986) was a physician and pioneer aviator.

Early life

Born in Nassau, Bahamas, he was the third child (second to survive infancy) born to Horatio Alexander Forsyth and Lillian Maud Byndloss. As a toddler, Forsythe moved with his family to Port Antonio, Jamaica, where his father became a prominent civil engineer.

At aged fifteen, Forsythe emigrated to the United States to study architecture at Tuskegee Institute. Forsythe continued his education at University of Illinois and finally at University of Toledo where he earned his Bachelor of Science.  Forsyth then went on to medical school and graduated from McGill University Medical School in Canada.

Aviation

In 1933, Forsythe and C. Alfred "Chief" Anderson were the first black pilots to make a round-trip cross-country flight from Atlantic City, New Jersey, to Los Angeles, California. They made the cross country journey in a Fairchild 24 named "The Pride of Atlantic City."  The plane was not equipped with parachutes, a radio or landing lights, and they navigated using a road map. Later that same year, the two became the first black pilots to fly across an international border to Montreal, Quebec, Canada.

In 1934, Forsythe and Anderson bought a  Lambert Monocoupe and christened it the "Booker T. Washington," in which they flew their Southamerican Good Will Flight. During this tour, the duo accomplished several ground-breaking feats in the Caribbean.

Letters said to have been written by Forsythe during his historic flights were found by a woman under the porch of an Atlantic City home in 2011.  The woman, Joi-Dickerson-Neal, said she rescued the letters from her grandfather George Dickerson's house, letters that had been written to her grandfather's late wife, the former Edith Holland, who, at the time they were written, was apparently romantically involved with Forsythe.

Personal life
In 1945, Forsythe married Francis T. Chew, a nurse he met in Atlantic City.  The couple settled the following year in Newark, New Jersey, where they remained until Forsythe's death in 1986.

After Forsythe's death, Francis spent much of her time championing her late husband's accomplishments and ensuring that various artifacts from Forsythe's historic feats would be placed in historic archives.  Francis died in Newark, New Jersey in 2009.

The couple did not have children.

Legacy

Forsythe and Anderson's accomplishments are memorialized at the Lambert-St. Louis International Airport's Black Americans in Flight mural.

References

Physicians from New Jersey
American aviators
1897 births
1986 deaths
McGill University Faculty of Medicine alumni
University of Illinois alumni
University of Toledo alumni
Migrants from the British Bahamas to British Jamaica
Emigrants from British Jamaica to the United States